Ernest P. Fernando (26 October 1938 – 16 December 2022) was a Sri Lankan wrestler. He competed in the men's freestyle flyweight at the 1964 Summer Olympics.

References

External links
 

1938 births
2022 deaths
Sri Lankan male sport wrestlers
Olympic wrestlers of Sri Lanka
Wrestlers at the 1964 Summer Olympics
Place of birth missing